Renzo Cramerotti (born 9 December 1947) is a retired male javelin thrower from Italy who won two medals at the Mediterranean Games. He competed at the 1972 Olympics and finished in 20th place.

Biography
Nationally Cramerotti won seven javelin titles, in 1970–1973 and 1975–1977.

Achievements

References

External links
 

1947 births
Living people
Italian male javelin throwers
Athletes (track and field) at the 1972 Summer Olympics
Olympic athletes of Italy
Sportspeople from Trento
Mediterranean Games gold medalists for Italy
Mediterranean Games bronze medalists for Italy
Athletes (track and field) at the 1971 Mediterranean Games
Athletes (track and field) at the 1975 Mediterranean Games
Mediterranean Games medalists in athletics
20th-century Italian people
21st-century Italian people